Red skin may refer to:
Flushing (physiology), to temporarily become markedly red in the face or other areas of the skin
Erythroderma, an inflammatory disease of the skin that causes a red appearance along with scaling
Erythema, a symptom describing redness of skin or mucous membranes caused by increased blood flow in the superficial capillaries
Topical steroid withdrawal, also known as red burning skin
Sunburn, a form of radiation burn that affects living tissue
Burn, a type of injury to skin, or other tissues

See also
Redskin (disambiguation)